D29 is a state road in the northwestern Croatia connecting Novi Golubovec and the D35 state road to Soblinec on the D3 state road near the A4 motorway Popovec interchange.

The road, as well as all other state roads in Croatia, is managed and maintained by Hrvatske ceste, state owned company.

Traffic volume 

Traffic is regularly counted and reported by Hrvatske ceste, operator of the road.

Road junctions and populated areas

Maps

Sources

D029
D029
D029